Semanticity is one of Charles Hockett's 16 design features of language. Semanticity refers to the use of arbitrary or nonarbitrary signals to transmit meaningful messages.

See also 

 Hockett's design features

References

Language acquisition
Semantics
Linguistic universals